Split is a fantasy for solo piano and orchestra by the American composer Andrew Norman. The work was commissioned by the New York Philharmonic for the pianist Jeffrey Kahane. It was first performed in David Geffen Hall, New York City on December 10, 2015, by the New York Philharmonic and Jeffrey Kahane under the conductor James Gaffigan.

Composition
Split has a duration of roughly 25 minutes and is composed in one continuous movement.

Reception
Split has received a very positive response from music critics. Reviewing the world premiere, George Grella of the New York Classical Review called the piece "a stellar work" and a worthy companion to Norman's 2013 symphony Play, adding, "Split is less manic than playful, and by repeating material that, if stitched together in linear form would make a long, connected line, the piece coheres through an accumulating collection of events." Grella continued, "It was a dazzling listen and great fun throughout. Kahane and the orchestra played with great agility and energy. This is music that showcases smarts as much as chops and the performance made every detail of composition and orchestration clear, even as things happened fast and furiously." Justin Davidson of New York lauded the piece for "a personality that feels, if not exactly unified, at least reassuringly whole." He remarked:
Anthony Tommasini of The New York Times called the piece "audacious, exhilarating and, in a way, exhausting" and wrote:
In addition to praising the performance, Tommasini nevertheless added:

References

Compositions by Andrew Norman
2015 compositions
Contemporary classical compositions
Compositions for piano and orchestra
Music commissioned by the New York Philharmonic